The 20th Guards Combined Arms Army (originally designated as the 4th Tank Army, 4th Guards Tank Army in 1945, 4th Guards Mechanised Army in 1946,  and the 20th Guards Army in 1960 within the Soviet Ground Forces) is a field army. In 1991, after the dissolution of the Soviet Union, the army became part of the Russian Ground Forces.

1st formation (4th Tank Army)
The army was first formed by Stavka order within Stalingrad Front on July 22, 1942, based on the remaining elements of the headquarters of the former 28th Army, which had been largely destroyed in recent fighting. Major General Vasily Kryuchenkin, commander of the former 28th Army, was given command of 4th Tank Army. The new formation incorporated the 22nd Tank Corps, under Major General Aleksandr Shamshin, and Major General Abram Khasin's 23rd Tank Corps, plus three rifle divisions transferred from the Far Eastern Front, two anti-tank regiments and two anti-aircraft regiments. 8th Separate Fighter Air Brigade provided support.

It was committed to battle without being fully formed, as German forces had broken through. The Army attempted to stop the German 6th Army, but was not successful and lost a large number of tanks. On 1 August 1942 official Soviet records show the Army as comprising the 22nd Tank Corps (133rd, 173rd, 176th, and 182nd Tank Brigades plus the 22nd Motor Rifle Brigade), the 18th and 205th Rifle Divisions, an independent brigade, and two artillery regiments. In August 1942 it fought on the southern approaches to Stalingrad, having conducted some successful counterattacks against units of the German 48th Panzer Corps.

4th Tank Army later came under command of General Konstantin Rokossovsky's Don Front. On 22 October Kryuchenkin was replaced by General Pavel Batov. The much diminished army was re-designated the 65th Army on 27 October, and served for the duration under Batov's command.

2nd formation (4th Guards Tank Army)
On 15 July 1943, after an abortive attempt to form the Army for a second time had been called off in February, it was reformed as 4th Guards Tank Army drawing on the headquarters of the previous 19th Cavalry Corps. Initially the new army consisted of 11th and 30th Ural Volunteer Tank Corps and 6th Guards Mechanised Corps.

Its first operation as 4th Tank Army, under Lt. General Tank Tr. Vasily Badanov, (July 1943 – March 1944) was at Orel, the counterattack (Operation Kutuzov) on the northern side of the Kursk bulge after the German defeat at the Battle of Kursk proper. John Erickson wrote that "at 1100 on 26 July, two of Badanov's corps (11th Tank and 6th Guards Mechanised) put in a ragged attack towards Bolkhov. For the next few hours, under the very gaze of Ivan Bagramyan [commander of 11th Guards Army, whose sector 4th Tank was attacking through] and Badanov, both corps were heavily battered by the concealed German tanks and assault guns." It took part in the winter battles in Ukraine in 1944 (Proskurov-Chernovitsy), then the Lvov–Sandomierz Operation in the summer. Its commander was  Lt. Gen. (later Col. Gen.) Dmitry Lelyushenko (March 1944 – May 1945). It then participated in the Lower Silesian, Upper Silesian, Berlin, and Prague operations. In the last days of the war, it achieved Guards status by an order of the NKO dated 17 March 1945 (Krasnaya Zvezda).

Cold War

It was initially part of the Central Group of Forces, but in 1947 was moved to eastern Germany. In the first days of the Soviet occupation of eastern Germany, it had its headquarters at Eberswalde and consisted of the 5th and 6th Guards Mechanised Corps and the 10th Guards Tank Corps.

From 1946 to 1957 the Army was named 4th Guards Mechanised Army. It was renamed 20th Guards Army in 1960, and served for many years as part of the Group of Soviet Forces in Germany. It took part in the Soviet invasion of Czechoslovakia in 1968. In 1982 the 14th Guards Motor Rifle Division became the 32nd Guards Tank Division, and two motor rifle regiments became tank regiments. In 1985 the former 6th Guards Motor Rifle Division became the 90th Guards Tank Division. In the late 1980s it controlled the 25th Tank Division (HQ Vogelsang, disbanded 1989), 32nd Guards Tank Division (HQ Juterbog, disbanded 1989), 90th Guards Tank Division (HQ Bernau, withdrawn to Chernorech'e in the Volga Military District, early 1990s), the 35th Motor Rifle Division (HQ Krampnitz, withdrawn to Chebarkul and disbanded, December 1991-April 1992), the 6th Guards Separate Motor Rifle Brigade at Berlin-Karlshorst (withdrawn to Kursk) and many combat support and service support units, including the 387th Guards Artillery Brigade, 27th and 464th Rocket Brigades, a SAM brigade, an engineer-sapper brigade, and two helicopter regiments. After the fall of the Soviet Union 20th Guards Army was withdrawn to Voronezh in the Moscow Military District.

Post Cold War
In June 2006 elements of the Army took part in the "Shield of Union" joint Russian-Belorussian exercises.(Warfare.ru) From 2009 to 2014 the 6th Separate Czestochowa Tank Brigade at Mulino was part of the army. In 2014 it transferred to the 1st Guards Tank Army. In mid-August 2016, Major General Yevgeny Nikiforov became the army commander. 68th Army Corps commander Major General Alexander Peryazev took command in February 2017 as Nikiforov transferred to the 58th Army.

Composition 
 3rd Motor Rifle Division (Boguchar)
144th Guards Motor Rifle Division (Yelnya)
 236th Artillery Brigade (Kolomna)
 448th Rocket Brigade (Kursk)
 53rd Guards Anti-Aircraft Missile Brigade (Kursk)
 99th Weapons and Equipment Storage Base (Tver)
 7015th Weapons and Equipment Storage Base (Mulino)
 152nd Logistic Support Brigade (Liski)
 9th Guards Command Brigade (Voronezh)
 Battalion of the 82nd Separate Warsaw Radio Engineering Special Purpose Brigade

Commanders 
The following officers have commanded the army:
 Major General Vasily Kryuchenkin (22 July 1942 – 20 October 1942)
 Colonel General Pavel Batov (22 October 1942 – 27 October 1942)
 Lieutenant General Vasily Badanov (15 July 1943 – 29 March 1944)
 Colonel General Dmitry Lelyushenko (29 March 1944 – 30 August 1947)
 Lieutenant General Viktor Obukhov (30 August 1947 – 15 December 1951)
 Major General Pyotr Kalininchenko (15 December 1951 – 11 May 1953)
 Lieutenant General Vladimir Komarov (11 May 1953 – 10 January 1955)
 Major General (promoted to Lieutenant General 8 August 1955) Vladimir Chizh (10 January 1955 – 22 January 1960)
 Major General (promoted to Lieutenant General 27 April 1962) Viktor Kotov (22 January 1960 – 9 December 1964)
 Major General (promoted to Lieutenant General 7 May 1966) Mikhail Khomulo (9 December 1964 – 12 May 1968)
 Lieutenant General Ivan Velichko (12 May 1968 – 12 May 1970)
 Major General (promoted to Lieutenant General 8 November 1971) Nikolay Lapygin (12 May 1970 – 19 October 1972)
 Lieutenant General Vladimir Sivenok (6 December 1972 – 7 July 1975)
 Major General (promoted to Lieutenant General 14 February 1977) Vladimir Arkhipov (7 July 1975 – 17 April 1979)
 Major General (promoted to Lieutenant General 25 October 1979) Ivan Chelombeyev (17 April 1979 – December 1981)
 Major General (promoted to Lieutenant General 5 November 1985) Albert Makashov (9 January 1982 – January 1986)
 Major General (promoted to Lieutenant General 16 February 1988) Alexander Chumakov (January 1986 – April 1988)
 Major General (promoted to Lieutenant General 18 December 1991) Mikhail Arkhipov (April 1988 – 22 December 1991)
 Lieutenant General Nikolay Pugachyov (23 December 1991 – 28 June 1993)
 Major General Alexey Nefyodov (29 June 1993 – 1994)
 Lieutenant General Vladimir Chuzhikov (1994–2000)
 Major General Sergey Makarov (2000 – August 2002)
 Lieutenant General Alexander Postnikov-Streltsov (August 2002 – November 2004)

References and sources

Citations

Bibliography 
Keith E. Bonn (ed.), Slaughterhouse: The Handbook of the Eastern Front, Aberjona Press, 2005, p. 334
see also (Ru) http://polk69wunsdorf.narod.ru/simple11.html 

Glantz, David M. 'Companion to Colossus Reborn' Univ. Press of Kansas, 2005.

Tank armies of the Soviet Union
Military units and formations established in 1942
Armies of the Russian Federation
Guards Armies